Houstonia acerosa, the New Mexico bluet or needleleaf bluet, is a plant species native to Chihuahua, Coahuila, Nuevo León, Tamaulipas, San Luis Potosí, Texas and New Mexico.

Houstonia acerosa is an herb up to 20 cm tall, with narrow needle-like leaves and white or purplish flowers.

Varieties
Three varieties of the species are widely accepted:

Houstonia acerosa var. acerosa - Coahuila, Nuevo León, Tamaulipas, San Luis Potosí, Texas
Houstonia acerosa var. polypremoides (A.Gray) Terrell - Chihuahua, Coahuila, New Mexico, trans-Pecos Texas
Houstonia acerosa var. tamaulipana (B.L.Turner) Terrell - Tamaulipas

References

External links
Photo of herbarium specimen at Missouri Botanical Garden, Wright 237, type specimen  of Houstonia acerosa
Gardening Europe Houstonia acerosa
Chihuahuan Desert Plants, University of Texas at El Paso, Hedyotis acerosa 

acerosa
Flora of Texas
Flora of New Mexico
Flora of Mexico
Flora of Chihuahua (state)
Flora of Coahuila
Flora of Nuevo León
Flora of Tamaulipas
Flora of San Luis Potosí
Plants described in 1852
Taxa named by Asa Gray